William Burr Cochran (July 9, 1863 – July 2, 1931) was an American Army Brigadier general during World War I.

Early life
Cochran was born to John Henry and Charlotte Cochran in Middleburg, Virginia. He attended the Virginia Military Institute, graduating with the class of 1888.

Career
Cochran enlisted in the Fifth Infantry on September 11, 1892. He received a commission as a second lieutenant on March 28, 1896.

He served during the Spanish American War.

Personal life 
He was a member of the Phi Delta Theta fraternity.

Death and legacy 
Cochran died on July 2, 1931 and is buried in Arlington National Cemetery.  His papers are held by the Archives of Virginia Military Institute.

References 

United States Army generals
Virginia Military Institute alumni
United States Army generals of World War I
Burials at Arlington National Cemetery